Cyperus cellulosoreticulatus is a species of sedge that is endemic to parts of northern and central South America.

The species was first formally described by the botanist Johann Otto Boeckeler in 1895.

See also
 List of Cyperus species

References

cellulosoreticulatus
Taxa named by Johann Otto Boeckeler
Plants described in 1895
Flora of Venezuela
Flora of Brazil
Flora of Bolivia